Xiaotangshan may refer to:

 Xiaotangshan Han Shrine, Shandong, China
 Xiaotangshan, Beijing, China
 Xiaotangshan Hospital